SIMPO (full legal name: SIMPO a.d. Vranje) is a Serbian home furnishing manufacturer and retailer, with the headquarters located in Vranje.

History
Founded in 1963 as Sima Pogačarević furniture factory (named after a local fighter from World War II), the company was unsuccessful in its first four years, until in 1967, when Dragan Tomić was appointed as the new CEO. He began a period of growth and prosperity for the company, transforming a small company with 370 employees into one of the most successful Yugoslav companies.

47.31% of Simpo Vranje's capital is held by legal entities, including 28.83% by the Akcionarski Beograd fund, and 43.75% by natural persons.

In 1995, SIMPO sold its water-bottling company "Vlasinska voda" to Coca-Cola HBC for 20 million euros.

During the 2010s, the company became unprofitable, which resulted in cutting the number of employees, from around 4,400 in 2013 to around 2,600 as of 2016. Also, in March 2015 a long-time general director Dragan Tomić, who stayed at the position from 1967 to 2015, was sacked from the position by the Government of Serbia due to poor results.

In November 2020, the Government of Serbia announced that it will be seeking new owners of several large companies owned by the Government through the privatization process; among them being SIMPO.

Name
The name SIMPO is a syllabic abbreviation from the original name and is usually spelled with all capital letters, but variants 'Simpo' and 'simpo' are common, too.

Activities 
Simpo offers living room furniture (sofas, armchairs, tables, shelves etc.), storage furniture and decorative accessories, bedroom furniture and accessories (beds, rugs) as well as mattresses and bedding. Its product range also includes kitchen and dining room furniture and equipment and office furniture. The company also sells lighting and accessories for balconies and gardens.

See also
 List of supermarket chains in Serbia

References

External links
 

1963 establishments in Serbia
Companies based in Vranje
Retail companies established in 1963
Furniture companies of Serbia
Furniture retailers of Serbia
Serbian brands